Radioimmunotherapy (RIT) uses an antibody labeled with a radionuclide to deliver cytotoxic radiation to a target cell. It is a form of unsealed source radiotherapy. In cancer therapy, an antibody with specificity for a tumor-associated antigen is used to deliver a lethal dose of radiation to the tumor cells.  The ability for the antibody to specifically bind to a tumor-associated antigen increases the dose delivered to the tumor cells while decreasing the dose to normal tissues.  By its nature, RIT requires a tumor cell to express an antigen that is unique to the neoplasm or is not accessible in normal cells.

History of available agents

131I tositumomab and 90Y ibritumomab tiuxetan were the first agents of radioimmunotherapy, and they were approved for the treatment of refractory non-Hodgkin's lymphoma.  This means they are used in patients whose lymphoma is refractory to conventional chemotherapy and the monoclonal antibody rituximab.

Agents in clinical development
A set of radioimmunotherapy drugs that rely upon an alpha-emitting isotope (e.g., bismuth-213 or, preferably, actinium-225), rather than a beta emitter, as the killing source of radiation is being developed. Several phase II clinical trials for the treatment of acute myeloid leukemia have been carried out using alpha-emitting RITs.

90Y-FF-21101 is a monoclonal antibody against P-cadherin radiolabeled with yttrium-90. It is one of several RIT treatments under investigation intending to treat solid tumors. A phase I clinical trial began in 2015.

Other applications (non-approved indications)
Other types of cancer for which RIT has therapeutic potential include prostate cancer, metastatic melanoma, ovarian cancer, neoplastic meningitis, leukemia, high-grade brain glioma, and metastatic colorectal cancer.

References

External links
 
 Radioimmunotherapy.org

Radiation therapy